Globe Knitting Mills, also known as the Rambo & Regar Globe Knitting Mills, are two historic textile mill buildings located at Norristown, Montgomery County, Pennsylvania. They were built in 1898, and were referred to as the "Main (Knitting) Building" and the "Oxidizing Building / Dye House."  They are constructed of red brick with heavy timber framing and Italianate style design elements.  The main building is three stories tall and rectangular in plan.

It was added to the National Register of Historic Places in 2003.

References

Industrial buildings and structures on the National Register of Historic Places in Pennsylvania
Italianate architecture in Pennsylvania
Industrial buildings completed in 1898
Buildings and structures in Montgomery County, Pennsylvania
National Register of Historic Places in Montgomery County, Pennsylvania